Matthew Paul Daly (born 10 March 2001) is an English professional footballer who plays for Harrogate Town on loan from Championship side Huddersfield Town as an attacking midfielder.

Club career
Daly was previously at Everton as a youngster before signing for Huddersfield Town in September 2015. He made his first team debut for the Terriers as a first-half substitute for Jonathan Hogg in their 2–1 defeat to Watford in the Premier League on 20 April 2019. Daly also became the 5th youngest player to make his Premier League debut of the season at 18 years, 1 month and 10 days old. Daly scored his 1st goal for the Terriers against Charlton on 10 December 2019, an injury time winner.

On 5 August 2021, Daly signed for newly-promoted League Two side Hartlepool United on loan. He made his debut for Hartlepool as a late substitute in a 1–0 victory against Crawley Town. Huddersfield recalled Daly on 17 January 2022. Daly made 27 appearances with 7 goals leaving the club as top scorer

On 18 January 2022, the day after being recalled from Hartlepool United, Daly returned to League Two to join Bradford City on loan until the end of the season. Upon requiring surgery after 9 appreances Daly then returned to Huddersfield for recovery.

On 27 June 2022, Daly joined Harrogate Town on loan for the whole of the 2022–23 season.

International career
He has represented England at international youth levels, including under-17, where he received 10 caps including his participation at the 2018 UEFA European Under-17 Championship, which included scoring the winning goal in the 2–1 win over Israel under-17s in their first match, which would eventually lead to a semi-final defeat to the Netherlands under-17s on a penalty shootout, although Daly did score England's second penalty.
In May 2019, Daly was part of the England U18s squad that competed at the Slovakia Cup.

Career statistics

References

2001 births
Living people
English footballers
People from Stockport
Association football midfielders
England youth international footballers
Huddersfield Town A.F.C. players
Hartlepool United F.C. players
Bradford City A.F.C. players
Harrogate Town A.F.C. players
Premier League players
English Football League players